Eli Janney is an American record producer and engineer born in Washington, D.C. Janney played bass and keyboards as well as sang backing vocals in indie rock/post-hardcore band Girls Against Boys. He currently plays keyboard in and is associate music director of the 8G band on the Late Night with Seth Meyers show on NBC. He is also the co-host of SonicScoop's InputOutput Podcast, along with Geoff Sanoff of the band Edsel.

Biography
Janney was born in Washington, D.C., and started recording with bands, including Jawbox. During this period he was active as a musician for Girls Against Boys he produced recording artists like Brainiac, Enon, Skeleton Key, Hooverphonic, Melissa Auf der Maur, Ryan Adams, The Nation of Ulysses, Every Move A Picture, The Rapture. When Girls Against Boys became inactive after 2003, he became a full-time recording and remixing artist for musical artists like James Blunt, Voicst, Nicole Atkins, Satellite Party, Future Kings of Spain and others.

References

External links
 Official site

The 8G Band members
American multi-instrumentalists
Record producers from Washington, D.C.
Post-hardcore musicians
Living people
Musicians from Washington, D.C.
Year of birth missing (living people)